Thomas Zereske (22 May 1966 – 28 June 2004) is a German, originally East German, sprint canoeist who competed from 1988 to 2000.

Sporting career
Zereske won ten medals at the ICF Canoe Sprint World Championships with two gold medals (C-2 200 m: 1997, 1998), three silver medals (C-1 200 m: 1995, C-1 500 m: 1990, C-2 200 m: 1990), and five bronze medals (C-1 1000 m: 1990, C-2 200 m: 1999, C-2 500 m: 1997, 1998; C-4 500 m: 1991).

Competing in three Summer Olympics, Zereske earned his best finish of fifth place three times (C-1 500 m: 1996 for Germany, C-2 500 m: 1988 for East Germany, 2000 for Germany).

As the German national championships, Zereske won two C-1 200 m, three C-2 200 m, and four C-4 200 m titles. He also won national championship in C-1 500 m three times and C-1 10000 m once. Zereske earned a German national championship in the C-2 500 m event in 1997.

Coaching career
After Zereske retired from canoeing, he became a coach of the German Dragon Boat racing national team. As a coach, his teams won a complete set of medals in 2002 with a gold in the women's 500 m, a silver in the men's 500 m, and a bronze in the men's 250 m; and two silver medals in 2003. The 2003 silvers were in the men's 500 m and women's 500 m events.

Death
A native of Neubrandenburg, Zereske died of leukemia in 2004. Zereske had only been diagnosed with leukemia five days prior to his death. His former canoeing partner Christian Gille wore a black armband in honor of Zereske during the 2004 Summer Olympic sprint canoeing events. After Gille and his current teammate won the gold in the C-2 1000 m event at those games, Gille dedicated the medal to his fallen teammate.

References

1966 births
2004 deaths
Canoeists at the 1988 Summer Olympics
Canoeists at the 1996 Summer Olympics
Canoeists at the 2000 Summer Olympics
Deaths from leukemia
German male canoeists
Olympic canoeists of East Germany
Olympic canoeists of Germany
ICF Canoe Sprint World Championships medalists in Canadian